Ernest Austen (23 September 1900 – 21 June 1983) was an Australian cricketer. He played nine first-class cricket matches for Victoria between 1925 and 1930.

See also
 List of Victoria first-class cricketers

References

External links
 

1900 births
1983 deaths
Australian cricketers
Victoria cricketers
Cricketers from Melbourne